The 2007 FEI European Jumping Championship was the 29th edition of the European Show Jumping Championships. Running from August 14 to August 19, 2007, it was the second edition held at the MVV Riding Stadium in Mannheim, Germany, the previous being the 1997 championships. Meredith Michaels-Beerbaum of Germany won the individual jumping event, while the Netherlands won the team jumping event. Mannheim incorporated the event as part of its 400th anniversary celebrations.

Results

Medal table

Individual jumping

Team jumping

External links
Official website

 
2000s in Baden-Württemberg
August 2007 sports events in Europe
Sports competitions in Mannheim
21st century in Nuremberg